The Washington Monument at West Point is an equestrian monument to George Washington at the United States Military Academy at West Point, New York.  The bronze replica of a sculpture that was originally designed by Henry Kirke Brown and erected in Union Square, New York City, in 1856— the first equestrian sculpture cast in the United States— was obtained for West Point by Clarence P. Towne and dedicated in 1916. It formerly sat at the north end of the Plain.  After expansion of Washington Hall in 1971, it was moved to its current location outside the hall's front entrance.

See also
 List of statues of George Washington
 List of sculptures of presidents of the United States

References

Monuments and memorials at West Point
Equestrian statues in New York (state)
Bronze sculptures in New York (state)
1916 sculptures
Sculptures by Henry Kirke Brown
Statues of George Washington
Monuments and memorials to George Washington in the United States
Relocated buildings and structures in New York (state)